David A. Nutter (born April 2, 1955 in Clarksburg, West Virginia) is an American politician of the Republican Party. From 2002 to 2012, he served as a member of the Virginia House of Delegates. He represented the 7th district in the southwest part of the state, including the city of Radford and parts of Montgomery and Pulaski Counties. In 2011, Nutter decided to forgo a re-election campaign for his House seat and unsuccessfully challenged State Senator John S. Edwards in the 21st district. In 2012, Governor Bob McDonnell appointed Nutter to serve on the State Board of Community Colleges.

Notes

References

Re-elect Dave Nutter Delegate (Campaign website)

External links

1955 births
Living people
Republican Party members of the Virginia House of Delegates
Virginia Tech alumni
People from Christiansburg, Virginia
Politicians from Clarksburg, West Virginia
Methodists from Virginia
21st-century American politicians